Korea's Got Talent is a South Korean reality television show that was first broadcast on 4 June 2011 on tvN. The show is based on the Got Talent series format, originating with Britain's Got Talent. This is the show's first series in Korea. The judges are Kolleen Park, Jang Jin and Song Yun-ah.

The show started accepting applicants on 9 February 2011 via ARS, the official website, and smart phone apps. The show held regional auditions nationwide starting in Busan on 2 April 2011.

The show became famous around the world after a video of Sung-Bong Choi's appearance gained worldwide media attention.

For prizes, the semi-finalists will have the opportunity to sign with Sony Music, and the winner will receive US$100,000.

Auditions
Auditions were held in Seoul, Daejeon, Gwangju, Daegu, Busan, and Incheon.

Semifinal
The semi-finals are live shows with an audience. They air at 11 pm to midnight. The winner of the audience vote and a judge's choice from between the second and third place act go through to the top 10 final. In the second round, it was revealed that the judges would rank each act from 1st to 8th at the end of their performance. This has caused errors from the judges ranking one act too high thus putting a better act too low, like Jang Jin's error with I Big Harmonica Ensemble.

1st Semifinal
Audience Voting: 96,457

2nd Semifinal
Audience Voting: 38,321

3rd Semifinal
Audience Voting: 33,736

4th Semifinal
Audience Voting: 46,428

5th Semifinal
Audience Voting: 38,755

Grand final
Audience Voting: 135,221

There was a placement draw held to determine the performance orders.
The live finale began with Kim Ha-Joon's sand animation of the story of Japan crushing Korea's dreams, and finishing with the phrase, 'Dokdo is our territory'. Kim Tae-Hyun then sang Michael Jackson's 'Heal the World'. Kim Jong-Hwan performed a B-boy dance followed by an ABBA Medley Harmonica Performance by I Big Harmonica Ensemble. Kim Min-Ji sang 'You Raise Me Up', and then IUV lip-sync'ed a medley of songs, finishing with Cinderella, their audition song. Kim Chan-Yang displayed a sword fighting dance, and then World Sensation Choi Sung-Bong sang an encore of his DaeJeon audition performance, Nella Fantasia. Joo Min-Jeong displayed a Poppin Dance in her gold uniform, and Magicians Escape performed a magic trick where one man would go into a box, but then turns out to be a woman at the end.
After 10–15 minutes of voting, the top 3 were announced. They were: IUV, Joo Min-Jeong and Choi Sung-Bong. IUV was overwhelmed with tears and despite finishing in third, they were very happy and thanked the crowd and South Korea. Then Joo Min-Jeong was announced as the winner, with her mother in the audience. Choi Sung-Bong finished 2nd. Joo Min-Jeong received 300,000,000 Korean Won, almost US$300,000. She also received a new car (Renault Samsung QM5 SUV). Choi Sung-Bong as well as other top 40 singers were given the opportunity to sign with Sony Music.

Notes

References 

2011 South Korean television seasons
Korea's Got Talent